Thallium nitrate may refer to:

Thallium(I) nitrate
Thallium(III) nitrate

Thallium compounds
Nitrates